Timora daphoena is a species of moth of the family Noctuidae first described by George Hampson in 1910. It is found in Africa, including South Africa.

External links
 

Heliothinae